Cheung Prey is a district (srok) of Kampong Cham province, Cambodia. The district capital is Skuon town. This busy market town has grown up around the intersection of National Highway 6 and National Highway 7. Skun is around 49 kilometres east of the provincial capital at Kampong Cham city and 75 kilometres north of the Cambodian capital Phnom Penh.
 
The district capital of Skuon is also known as "Spiderville." The town has become famous with both locals and international visitors to Cambodia for its fried spiders. The spiders are either captured in their burrows or bred for sale. First the venom is removed and then the spider is killed by squeezing the thorax. The spiders are then fried whole with garlic and salt. The practice of eating spiders in Cheung Prey began under the Democratic Kampuchea regime in Cambodia. Eating spiders and other insects helped locals starving from the harsh policies of the Khmer Rouge. Now that local residents have acquired the taste, the fame of the crunchy spiders has spread and people travel from Phnom Penh just to sample the deep fried arachnae. International visitors also travel to Skun to see the spiders, but most are content to take photographs rather than sample this unusual delicacy.

Location 
Cheung Prey district is in eastern Kampong Cham Province. Reading from the north clockwise, Cheung Prey shares a border with Baray district of Kampong Thom province to the north and the district of Prey Chhor to the east. To the south of Batheay is Kang Meas district and Batheay district forms the western border.

Administration 
The Cheung Prey district governor reports to Hun Neng, the Governor of Kampong Cham. The following table shows the villages of Cheung Prey district by commune.

Demographics 

The district is subdivided into 10 communes (khum) and 74 villages (phum). According to the 1998 Census, the population of the district was 74,859 persons in 14,562 households in 1998. With a population of over 70,000 people, Cheung Prey is one of the smallest districts by population in Kampong Cham province, after Koh Soutin and Kampong Cham districts. The average household size in Cheung Prey is 5.1 persons per household, the same as the rural average for Cambodia. The sex ratio in the district is 95.5%, with more females than males.

References

External links
update 11-09-2019 by yim marin
Kampong Cham at Royal Government of Cambodia website
Kampong Cham at Ministry of Commerce website

Districts of Kampong Cham province